Mehmet Şandır (born in 1947, in Bayırbucak, Syria) is a Turkish politician. He is a former MP of the Turkish Nationalist Movement Party, and is currently an Honorary President of the Syrian Turkmen Assembly.

Early life and career
Şandır was born in 1947 in Bayırbucak, Syria, to Hasan and Atika Şandır.  He graduated from Istanbul University in the Faculty of Forestry. Şandır served as the Turkish Minister of Forest and Water Management and then the Minister of Customs and Trade.

Personal life
Şandır is married and has three children.

References

Living people
People from Latakia
Syrian people of Turkish descent
Syrian people of Circassian descent
Nationalist Movement Party politicians
1947 births